Big News is a 1929 American pre-Code film directed by Gregory La Cava, released by Pathé Exchange, and starring Robert Armstrong and Carole Lombard, billed as "Carol Lombard".

Cast
Robert Armstrong as Steve Banks
Carole Lombard as Margaret Banks (billed as Carol Lombard)
Louis Payne as Hensel
Wade Boteler as O'Neill
Charles Sellon as Addison
Sam Hardy as Reno
Tom Kennedy as Officer Ryan
Warner Richmond as District Attorney Phelps
Helen Ainsworth as Vera, society editor
James Donlan as Deke
George "Gabby" Hayes as Hoffman, reporter
Vernon Steele as reporter
Clarence Wilson as Coroner
Colin Chase as Birn
Robert Dudley as Telegraph editor

Plot
Steve Banks (Armstrong) is a hard-drinking newspaper reporter. His wife Margaret (Lombard), a reporter for a rival paper, threatens to divorce him if he doesn't quit the drinking that is compromising his career. Steve pursues a story about drug dealers even when his editor fires him. When the editor is murdered, Steve is accused of the killing.

Preservation status
The film exists in a 16mm reduction print.

References

External links

Big News at SilentEra

1929 films
1929 comedy films
American black-and-white films
Silent American comedy films
American films based on plays
1920s English-language films
Films about journalists
Films directed by Gregory La Cava
Pathé Exchange films
1920s American films